Marcel Wildhaber (born 17 May 1985) is a Swiss former professional cyclo-cross cyclist and cross-country mountain biker.

Major results

Cyclo-cross

2007–2008
 3rd Aigle
 3rd Uster
2009–2010
 1st Aigle
 3rd GP Wetzikon
2010–2011
 1st Steinmaur
 3rd Bussnang
2011–2012
 1st Steinmaur
 1st Hittnau
 3rd Frenkendorf
 3rd Bussnang
2012–2013
 1st Flückiger Cross Madiswil
 2nd Aigle
 2nd GP-5-Sterne-Region
 3rd Frenkendorf
 3rd Bussnang
2013–2014
 1st GP-5-Sterne-Region
 2nd National Championships
 2nd Sion-Valais
 3rd Sion-Valais
2014–2015
 1st Schlosscross
 National Trophy Series
1st Milton Keynes
 2nd Flückiger Cross Madiswil
2015–2016
 EKZ CrossTour
1st Eschenbach
 2nd Illnau
2016–2017
 1st Overall EKZ CrossTour
1st Eschenbach
 1st QianSen Trophy Fengtai Station
 1st Steinmaur
 2nd Flückiger Cross Madiswil
 3rd GP Luzern Pfaffnau
2017–2018
 1st Overall EKZ CrossTour
1st Bern
1st Aigle
 Qiansen Trophy
2nd Yanqing
2nd Fengtai Changxindian
 2nd Nyon
 2nd Sion-Valais
 2nd Illnau
2018–2019
 2nd Flückiger Cross Madiswil
 2nd Brugherio
2019–2020
 2nd Illnau
 Toi Toi Cup
3rd Slaný
3rd Mladá Boleslav

MTB
2013
 1st  National XCE Championships
2015
 1st  National XCE Championships
 3rd  European XCE Championships

References

External links

1985 births
Living people
Swiss male cyclists
Cyclo-cross cyclists